Karnet Prison Farm is a minimum-security Western Australian prison located in Keysbrook State Forest,  south of Perth, in the Shire of Serpentine-Jarrahdale.

The prison farm is located on a  property and produces most of the vegetables, meat, milk, and eggs for Western Australia's prisons. It has an abattoir, a dairy, a poultry farm, and an orchard and hydroponic gardens.

The location was made a prison in 1963, and was formerly a facility for the treatment of alcoholics.

It houses male prisoners, and has an inmate population of 360 as of 2019. It is a pre-release facility, open only to prisoners with less than five years to their earliest possible release date, and so aims to prepare prisoners for re-entrance into society after their incarceration.

Notable past inmates include Alan Bond and Jimmy Krakouer.

References 

Prisons in Western Australia
1963 establishments in Australia
Farms in Australia